Dian Badenhorst (born ) is a South African rugby union player for the  in the Pro14, the  in the Currie Cup and the  in the Rugby Challenge. His regular position is scrum-half.

Personal life

Badenhorst was born in Bloemfontein. He is the son of Chris Badenhorst, a former wing that played in two tests for the South Africa national team in 1994 and 1995.

References

1996 births
Living people
Cheetahs (rugby union) players
Free State Cheetahs players
Pumas (Currie Cup) players
Rugby union players from Bloemfontein
Rugby union scrum-halves
South African rugby union players